AMS or Ams may refer to:

Organizations

Companies
 Alenia Marconi Systems
 American Management Systems
 AMS (Advanced Music Systems)
 ams AG, semiconductor manufacturer
 AMS Pictures
 Auxiliary Medical Services

Educational institutions
 Arthur Morgan School, North Carolina, US
 Hanoi – Amsterdam High School, Hanoi, Vietnam
 Army Medical School, US
 Academy of Military Science (People's Republic of China)
 Academy of Military Science (United States)
 Association of Muslim Schools, global
 Antwerp Management School

Government agencies
 Agricultural Marketing Service, US
 Army Map Service, US, later National Geospatial-Intelligence Agency
 Army Medical Services, UK

Societies and associations
 Alma Mater Society of Queen's University, student society, Canada
 Alma Mater Society of the University of British Columbia, student society, Canada
 American Mathematical Society
 American Meteor Society
 American Meteorological Society
 American Montessori Society
 American Musicological Society
 The Ancient Monuments Society, England and Wales
 Association of Muslim Scholars

Other
 Aboriginal Medical Service, an Indigenous Australian community-controlled health service in Sydney

Science and technology

Chemical substances
 Sodium 2-anthraquinonesulfonate known as AMS
 Ammonium sulfate, sometimes abbreviated as AMS
 Allyl methyl sulfide
 Alpha-methylstyrene, a chemical intermediate
 Ammonium sulfamate, an herbicide

Chemistry and physics 
 Accelerator mass spectrometry
 AMS radiocarbon dating
 Aerosol mass spectrometry
 Alpha Magnetic Spectrometer, AMS-02
 Anisotropy of magnetic susceptibility

Medicine
 Acute mountain sickness, a form of altitude sickness
 Altered Mental Status, see Altered level of consciousness
Antimicrobial stewardship
 Ablepharon macrostomia syndrome, an autosomal dominant genetic disorder

Software
 Address Management System of the US Postal Service
 Access Method Services
 Application Maintenance Support (see Software Maintenance)
 Association Management System

Technology
 Analog and mixed-signal, as in Verilog-AMS and VHDL-AMS
 Anti Missile Systems in missile defense
 Automatic milking systems in dairy farming

Other uses
 Acquisition Management System issued by the US Federal Aviation Administration
 Additional Member System of voting
 Alan Michael Sugar, British businessman, uses initials for enterprises such as Amstrad
 American Samoa, UNDP code
 AMS, group of characters in The House of the Dead (series)
 Amsterdam (Amtrak station) in New York (Amtrak station code)
 Amsterdam Airport Schiphol (IATA airport code)
 Atlanta Motor Speedway
 Auto, Motor und Sport, a German automobile magazine